Daniel King-Turner (born 15 May 1984) is a former professional tennis player from New Zealand. In total, he won eight Futures singles titles as well as two Challenger doubles titles and 10 Futures doubles titles. He also made the semi-finals of two Challenger events, Pozoblanco in 2010 and Binghamton in 2012.

He was a member of the New Zealand Davis Cup team between 2005 and 2013, competing in 19 ties, and winning 24 of 41 rubbers.

He attended Nelson College from 1996 to 1999.

He currently coaches at Scarbro Tennis Park with Te Kani Williams.

ATP/ITF Tour Finals

Singles (8–0)

Doubles (12–1)

References

External links
 
 

1984 births
Living people
New Zealand male tennis players
People educated at Nelson College